Bernadette Zurbriggen (born 30 August 1956) is a former Swiss alpine skier.

Career
During her career she has achieved 18 results among the top 3 in the World Cup. In the 1970s, Zurbriggen won seven World Cup races: five in Downhill, one in Giant Slalom and one in Alpine Combined.  She competed at three Winter Olympics between 1972 and 1980, with a seventh position in the Women's Downhill in both 1972 and 1976 her best finish.

World Cup results
Victories

References

External links
 
 

1956 births
Living people
Swiss female alpine skiers
Alpine skiers at the 1972 Winter Olympics
Alpine skiers at the 1976 Winter Olympics
Alpine skiers at the 1980 Winter Olympics
Olympic alpine skiers of Switzerland
20th-century Swiss women